Diana Ayala (born September 24, 1973) is an American politician, serving as a member and the deputy speaker of the New York City Council. Ayala represents the 8th district, succeeding former Council Speaker Melissa Mark-Viverito in 2017. The district includes Concourse, East Harlem, Highbridge, Longwood, Mott Haven, Port Morris, and Randall's Island. She is a member of the Democratic Party.

Early life and education
Born in Rio Piedras, Puerto Rico, she and her family moved to New York City when she was a child. They lived in public housing after living in shelters. She received an associate degree in Human Services from Bronx Community College.

Career 
Ayala worked as a Senior Center Director in East Harlem for seven years. She then served as Constituent Services Director and Deputy Chief of Staff for her predecessor, Melissa Mark-Viverito.

New York City Council 
Ayala ran against three other candidates in the Democratic primary for the open 8th city council district. Ayala had the support of Melissa Mark-Viverito, the term-limited incumbent and Speaker. Ayala's main primary opponent was Robert J. Rodriguez, an assemblyman. Ayala won the primary narrowly with 43.5% of the vote (4,012 votes) to Rodriguez's 42.23% (3,895 votes). In the general election, Ayala won 91.07% of the vote (13,617 votes), while her Republican opponent, Daby Benjaminé Carreras, won 5.26% (787 votes) and her Conservative opponent, Linda Ortiz, won 3.30% of the vote (494 votes).

Personal life 
Ayala and her long-time partner live in East Harlem. She has four children and three grandchildren.

References

External links
 Councilwoman Diana Ayala (official site)

New York (state) Democrats
Living people
Women New York City Council members
21st-century American politicians
21st-century American women politicians
American politicians of Puerto Rican descent
Hispanic and Latino American women in politics
People from Río Piedras, Puerto Rico
People from East Harlem
New York City Council members
Hispanic and Latino American New York City Council members
Bronx Community College alumni
1973 births